The Hampton Pirates and Lady Pirates refer to the sports teams representing Hampton University in Hampton, Virginia in intercollegiate athletics. The Pirates and Lady Pirates compete in the NCAA Division I Football Championship Subdivision (FCS) and are members of the Colonial Athletic Association.

The Pirates were previously members of the Mid-Eastern Athletic Conference between 1995 and 2018  and the Big South Conference from 2018 to 2022.

Teams

National championships

Team

Rivalries
Hampton has two main rivals:

Howard University, also known as The Real HU (Howard-Hampton) Rivalry

Norfolk State University, also known as the Battle of the Bay (Hampton–Norfolk State)

During Hampton's switch from the Mid-Eastern Athletic Conference to the Big South Conference, both rivalries were put on hold. In September 2019, Hampton will revive their rivalry with Howard during the Chicago Football Classic. The rivalry with Norfolk will resume on October 2, 2021.

Conference Switch 
A member of the Colonial Athletic Association, Hampton sponsors teams in eight men's and nine women's NCAA sanctioned sports. The school also sponsors a co-ed varsity sailing team, but sailing is not an NCAA sanctioned sport. The lacrosse team competes as an independent.

On November 16, 2017, Hampton announced they would be leaving the Mid-Eastern Athletic Conference to join the Big South Conference. Hampton is one of three Division I HBCU (after Tennessee State University of the Ohio Valley Conference and North Carolina A&T State of the Colonial Athletic Association) to be a member of a conference other than the Mid-Eastern Athletic Conference or Southwestern Athletic Conference.'

In 2022, Hampton joined the Colonial Athletic Association.

References

External links
 Women's Soccer Women's Volleyball